Four special routes of U.S. Route 521 exist, and two others have existed in the past. In order from south to north they are as follows.

Existing routes

Andrews business loop

U.S. Route 521 Business (US 521 Bus.) is a  business route of US 521 that travels through downtown Andrews, via Main Street. It follows the old US 521 mainline route.

Camden truck route 1

U.S. Route 521 Truck (US 521 Truck) is a truck route of US 521 to direct truck traffic to avoid downtown Camden. The highway takes various roads including: Ehrenclou Drive, Chestnut Ferry Road, Jefferson Davis Highway (in concurrency with US 1/US 601/SC 34), Springdale Drive, and Boykin Road (in concurrency with US 601 Truck). Nearly the entire length of the truck route is within the city limits of Camden.

Camden truck route 2

U.S. Route 521 Truck (US 521 Truck) is a  truck route of US 521 that exists entirely within the southern part of Camden. It uses York Street and Mill Street to connect US 521 (Broad Street) with US 1/SC 34 (East Dekalb Street). It is entirely concurrent with SC 34 Truck. The southbound lanes are also part of US 1 Truck, with no indication of US 1 Truck or SC 34 Truck; the northbound lanes have no indication of US 521 Truck.

Kershaw business loop

U.S. Route 521 Business (US 521 Bus.) is a  business route of US 521 that exists in Kershaw. It travels through downtown, via Hampton Street. It also has a concurrency with US 601 Bus. It follows the former path of US 521.

Kershaw truck route

U.S. Route 521 Truck (US 521 Truck) is a truck route of US 521 that exists entirely within the northern part of the town of Kershaw. It connects US 521 (North Matson Street) with US 521 Business (US 521 Bus.) and US 601 Bus. (North Hampton Street). It is completely concurrent with US 601, South Carolina Highway 157 Truck (SC 157 Truck), and SC 341 Truck. It is known as Hilton Street. There is no signs on US 521 or US 521 Bus./US 601 Bus. There is one sign just south of its northern terminus.

Kershaw connector route

U.S. Route 521 Connector (US 521 Conn.) is a  connector route of US 521 that serves to connect US 521 Business (US 521 Bus.) with US 521 (North Matson Street / Kershaw–Camden Highway) north of Kershaw. It is unnamed and is an unsigned highway.

Lancaster business loop

U.S. Route 521 Business (US 521 Bus.) is a  business route of US 521 that travels through downtown Lancaster, via Market Street and Main Street. It follows the old US 521 mainline route. At some point, it was relocated to Market Street until the intersection with Barr Street, where it turned left and then right onto Main Street.

Former special routes

Sumter connector

U.S. Route 521 Connector (US 521) was a  connector route that went east around Sumter along Guignard Drive, connecting to US 15, in the southern end of Sumter. This connector became part of the main route sometime before 2009.

Lancaster Bypass

U.S. Route 521 Bypass (US 521 Byp.) was the bypass around downtown Lancaster, until the mainline was realigned in 1965, and the former route was converted into US 521 Business (US 521 Bus.).

References

21-5
521 Banners
Special 21-5